Robert John Hibbs (April 21, 1943 – March 5, 1966) was a United States Army officer who graduated from the University of Northern Iowa and was a recipient of the United States military's highest decoration—the Medal of Honor—for his actions in the Vietnam War.

Biography
Hibbs joined the Army from Des Moines, Iowa in August 1964, and by March 5, 1966 was serving as a second lieutenant in Company B, 2nd Battalion, 28th Infantry Regiment, 1st Infantry Division. He had earned his commission thru the US Army Officer Candidate School OCS, Fort Benning, Ga.<file:Hibbs OCS class 6-65, 51st Co. 5th Stu Bn. Fort Benning, Ga.></ref>   . On 5 March 1966 during Operation Cocoa Beach, at Don Dien Lo Ke in the Republic of Vietnam, his patrol spotted a Viet Cong force approaching the 2nd Battalion's position. Hibbs led his small group in an attack on the enemy force and, with another soldier, volunteered to rescue a wounded comrade. After reaching the wounded man, Hibbs stayed behind to provide covering fire and was mortally wounded while attacking an enemy machine gun emplacement. For his actions during the battle, he was posthumously awarded the Medal of Honor a year later on February 24, 1967.

Hibbs, aged 22 at his death, was buried in Greenwood Cemetery, Cedar Falls, Iowa.

2LT Hibbs was honored by having a section of the UNI campus renamed in his honor, and a flagpole and monument erected with his name on it, just east of the West Gym.

Medal of Honor citation
Lieutenant Hibbs' official Medal of Honor citation reads:

For conspicuous gallantry and intrepidity at the risk of life above and beyond the call of duty. 2d Lt. Hibbs was in command of a 15-man ambush patrol of the 2d Battalion, when his unit observed a company of Viet Cong advancing along the road toward the 2d Battalion's position. Informing his command post by radio of the impending attack, he prepared his men for the oncoming Viet Cong, emplaced 2 mines in their path and, when the insurgents were within 20 feet of the patrol's position, he fired the 2 antipersonnel mines, wounding or killing half of the enemy company. Then, to cover the withdrawal of his patrol, he threw hand grenades, stepped onto the open road, and opened fire on the remainder of the Viet Cong force of approximately 50 men. Having rejoined his men, he was leading them toward the battalion perimeter when the patrol encountered the rear elements of another Viet Cong company deployed to attack the battalion. With the advantage of surprise, he directed a charge against the Viet Cong, which carried the patrol through the insurgent force, completely disrupting its attack. Learning that a wounded patrol member was wandering in the area between the 2 opposing forces and although moments from safety and wounded in the leg himself, he and a sergeant went back to the battlefield to recover the stricken man. After they maneuvered through the withering fire of 2 Viet Cong machine guns, the sergeant grabbed the dazed soldier and dragged him back toward the friendly lines while 2d Lt. Hibbs remained behind to provide covering fire. Armed with only an M16 rifle and a pistol, but determined to destroy the enemy positions, he then charged the 2 machine gun emplacements and was struck down. Before succumbing to his mortal wounds, he destroyed the starlight telescopic sight attached to his rifle to prevent its capture and use by the Viet Cong. 2d Lt. Hibb's profound concern for his fellow soldiers, and his intrepidity at the risk of his life above and beyond the call of duty are in the highest traditions of the U.S. Army and reflect great credit upon himself and the Armed Forces of his country.

See also

List of Medal of Honor recipients
List of Medal of Honor recipients for the Vietnam War
Memorial in his honor at UNI's West Gym

References

1943 births
1966 deaths
American military personnel killed in the Vietnam War
United States Army Medal of Honor recipients
United States Army officers
People from Cedar Falls, Iowa
People from Omaha, Nebraska
Vietnam War recipients of the Medal of Honor
United States Army personnel of the Vietnam War
Military personnel from Iowa